Fingerville may refer to:
 Fingerville, South Carolina: a census-designated place in the United States
 Fingerville, Keewatin: a former village which is now part of The Pas, Manitoba, Canada